Austrolestes io is an Australian species of damselfly in the family Lestidae,
commonly known as an iota ringtail. 
It has been found in both south-western Australia as well as south-eastern Australia where it inhabits pools, lakes and ponds.

Austrolestes io is a medium-sized to large damselfly, the male is light blue and brown.

Gallery

See also
 List of Odonata species of Australia

References 

Lestidae
Odonata of Australia
Insects of Australia
Endemic fauna of Australia
Taxa named by Edmond de Sélys Longchamps
Insects described in 1862
Damselflies